Patricia Lyfoung (born 1977) is a French cartoonist known for her series La Rose écarlate.

Biography 
Patricia Lyfoung was born in 1977 to a Hmong family in Villeneuve-la-Garenne, France. She became interested in drawing at a young age and moved to Paris, studying art at the École Estienne and at Gobelins, l'École de l'image.

In 2001, she began working for the French studio Marathon Animation, collaborating on storyboards for Martin Mystery and Totally Spies! She also worked as an illustrator for commercial and editorial clients.

By 2005, she had shifted to focus on comic books, publishing the first book in her young adult series La Rose écarlate with Delcourt. She was inspired by the aesthetic and costumes of the anime series The Rose of Versailles. Her other inspirations include the Japanese artists Rumiko Takahashi and Misturu Adachi, as well as the European comics creators Enrico Marini, Bernard Hislaire and Jean-Pierre Gibrat.

The series was a success, and she has produced over a dozen issues plus a spin-off series, La Rose écarlate – Missions, with her fellow French comic artist Jenny. La Rose écarlate has also been translated into English and published by the American publisher PaperCutz under the name The Scarlet Rose.

Lyfoung began another series, in 2012.

Selected works 
 La Rose écarlate (18 books)
 La Rose écarlate – Missions (9 books)
 Un prince à croquer (4 books)
 Les Mythics (16 issues)

References 

1977 births
Living people
French women cartoonists
French women writers
Hmong writers